Lawa Tabiki Airstrip  is a small airstrip serving Benzdorp, Suriname. The runway is on an island in the Lawa River, which forms the border between Suriname and French Guiana.

Charters and destinations 
Charter Airlines serving this airport are:

See also

 List of airports in Suriname
 Transport in Suriname

References

External links
Landing On Lawa Tabiki - YouTube
Blue Wing landing on Lawa Tabiki - YouTube
HERE/Nokia - Tabiki

Airports in Suriname
Sipaliwini District